The III Cavalry Corps ( literally: Higher Cavalry Command 3) was a formation of the German Army in World War I. The corps was formed on mobilization of the German Army in August 1914 and disbanded in 1919 during the demobilization of the German Army after World War I.

III Cavalry Corps 

Initially on the Western Front with 7th, 8th and Bavarian Cavalry Divisions preceding 6th Army.  Transferred to the East on 9 September 1914 and assigned to 9th Army with just 8th Cavalry Division.  Redesignated 20 November 1916 as 57th Corps (z.b.V.).

57th Corps 
57th Corps (z.b.V.) was formed on 20 November 1916 by the redesignation of III Cavalry Corps.  As the need for large mounted cavalry formations diminished as the war went on, the existing Cavalry Corps increasingly took on the characteristics of a normal Corps Command.  This culminated in them being redesignated as "General Commands for Special Use" Generalkommandos zur besonderen Verwendung (Genkdo z.b.V.).

By the end of the war, the Corps was serving on the Western Front as part of Armee-Abteilung C with the following composition:
 8th Landwehr Division
 255th Division

Order of Battle on mobilisation 
Initially, the Corps simply consisted of 3 Cavalry Divisions (with 2 Jäger battalions attached) without any Corps troops; in supply and administration matters, the Cavalry Divisions were entirely autonomous.  The commander was only concerned with tactics and strategy, hence his title of Senior Cavalry Commander Höherer Kavallerie-Kommandeur.

On formation in August 1914, the Corps consisted of:
7th Cavalry Division
8th Cavalry Division
Bavarian Cavalry Division
1st Bavarian Jäger Battalion
2nd Bavarian Jäger Battalion

Each cavalry division consisted of 3 cavalry brigades (6 regiments each of 4 squadrons), a horse artillery Abteilung (3 four-gun batteries), a machine gun detachment (company size, 6 MGs), plus pioneers, signals and a motor vehicle column.  A more detailed Table of Organisation and Equipment can be seen here.  The Jäger battalions each consisted of 4 light infantry companies, 1 machine gun company (6 MGs), 1 cyclist company and a motorised vehicle column.

Designations 
The corps was continually redesignated depending upon its role from time to time.

Commanders 
III Cavalry Corps / 57th Corps had the following commanders during its existence:

See also 

German Army (German Empire)
German Army order of battle (1914)
German Army order of battle, Western Front (1918)
German cavalry in World War I
TOE, German Cavalry Division, August 1914

References

Bibliography 
 
 

Corps of Germany in World War I
Cavalry corps of Germany
Military units and formations established in 1914
Military units and formations disestablished in 1919